Fire Services was a Hong Kong football team. The majority of the players are working for the Hong Kong Fire Services Department and playing for the club on an amateur basis.The club was dissolved after the 2014–15 season.

Honours
 Hong Kong Viceroy Cup
 Runners-up (1): 1969–70

Football clubs in Hong Kong
Hong Kong Fire Services Department
Works association football clubs in Hong Kong
Association football clubs disestablished in 2015
2015 establishments in Hong Kong